Gregory Douglas (born 25 June 1990, St. Michael, Barbados) is a Canadian sailor. He competed at the 2012 Summer Olympics in the Men's Finn class. Previously, he represented his native Barbados at the 2008 Olympics. He attended  Lakefield College School in Canada.

References

External links
Official website

1990 births
Barbadian male sailors (sport)
Canadian male sailors (sport)
Living people
Olympic sailors of Barbados
Olympic sailors of Canada
Sailors at the 2008 Summer Olympics – Laser
Sailors at the 2012 Summer Olympics – Finn
Black Canadian sportspeople
Barbadian emigrants to Canada